Javier Arturo López (born Feb. 22, 1983) is a Mexican professional baseball pitcher with the Diablos Rojos del México of the Mexican League. He played in Major League Baseball (MLB) for the San Diego Padres in 2009.

Career

Los Angeles Dodgers
López signed with the Los Angeles Dodgers as an international free agent on February 12, 2001. He made his professional debut with the rookie ball GCL Dodgers, recording a 5-1 record and 2.04 ERA in 14 appearances. He split the 2002 season between the rookie ball Great Falls Dodgers and the High-A Vero Beach Dodgers, accumulating a 7-3 record and 3.87 ERA between the two clubs. He split 2003 between the Single-A South Georgia Waves and Vero Beach, registering a 7.33 ERA in 31 games. In 2004, López played for the Single-A Columbus Catfish, recording a 5-4 record and 4.76 ERA with 83 strikeouts in 29 appearances.

San Diego Padres
On December 13, 2004, López was selected by the San Diego Padres in the minor league phase of the Rule 5 draft. He spent the 2005 season with the High-A Lake Elsinore Storm, pitching to a 5-11 record and 5.85 ERA in 27 appearances. In 2006, López split the year between Lake Elsinore and the Double-A Mobile BayBears, and also appeared in 21 games for the Diablos Rojos del México of the Mexican League, but struggled to a 9.49 ERA. He spent the majority of the 2007 season with the Double-A San Antonio Missions, notching a 4.54 ERA, and also recorded a 5.71 ERA in 9 games for the Diablos. He played in 3 games for the Triple-A Portland Beavers in 2008, spending the rest of the season with the Diablos, notching a 9-3 record and 3.45 ERA in 16 appearances. From 2001 to 2008 in the minors, Lopez had a 38–39 record with a 5.15 ERA.

López was invited to Spring Training with the Padres for the 2009 season. He did not make the club and was assigned to Triple-A Portland to begin the season. On April 28, 2009, López was selected to the 40-man roster and promoted to the major leagues for the first time. He made his major league debut on April 29, against the Colorado Rockies.
López allowed 5 runs in 2.1 innings for the Padres without striking anybody out before being optioned to Triple-A on May 11.

New York Mets
On June 19, 2009, López was claimed off waivers by the New York Mets. He did not play for the Mets in 2009, and spent the remainder of the year in Triple-A with the Buffalo Bisons, where he recorded a 3.86 ERA in 15 games. On February 24, 2010, López was designated for assignment by the Mets. He cleared waivers two days later and was invited to Spring Training as a non-roster invitee. He did not play in a game in 2010, and spent the 2011 season on loan to the Diablos Rojos del México, struggling to a 12.33 ERA in 10 games. In 2012 for Mexico, López recorded a 6-7 record and 6.44 ERA in 37 appearances.

San Diego Padres (second stint)
On January 29, 2013, López signed a minor league contract with the San Diego Padres organization. On March 24, 2013, López was loaned to the Diablos Rojos del Mexico of the Mexican League, the team with whom he played for in 2011. On August 21, 2013, López was reacquired by the Padres, and spent the remainder of the year with the Triple-A Tucson Padres. On December 13, 2013, López was released by the Padres.

Diablos Rojos del México
On March 29, 2014, López re-signed with the Diablos. López recorded an 11-4 record and 4.13 ERA in 24 games on the season. In 2015, López pitched to a 8-4 record and 5.34 ERA in 22 appearances. The next year, López made 22 appearances, pitching to a 4-11 record and 6.16 ERA. In 2017, he recorded a 7-7 record and 5.43 ERA with 55 strikeouts. On February 12, 2018, López was traded to the Guerreros de Oaxaca alongside Carlos Morales, Filiberto Baez, Javier Rodriguez, Jose Augusto Figueroa, and Luis Alfonso Garcia. On July 4, 2018, López was re-assigned to the Diablos.

López recorded a 2.84 ERA in 14 games for the club in 2018. In 2019, he recorded a 6-4 record and 5.48 ERA with 71 strikeouts in 22 games. After the 2019 season, he played for Yaquis de Obregón of the Mexican Pacific League(LVMP). In 2020, he did not play a game because of the cancellation of the Mexican League season due to the COVID-19 pandemic. After the 2020 season, he played for Yaquis of the LVMP. He also played for Mexico in the 2021 Caribbean Series.

References

External links

1983 births
Living people
Arizona League Padres players
Baseball players from Sinaloa
Buffalo Bisons (minor league) players
Cañeros de Los Mochis players
Columbus Catfish players
Diablos Rojos del México players
Great Falls Dodgers players
Guerreros de Oaxaca players
Gulf Coast Dodgers players
Lake Elsinore Storm players
Major League Baseball pitchers
Major League Baseball players from Mexico
Mexican expatriate baseball players in the United States
Mexican League baseball pitchers
Mobile BayBears players
Naranjeros de Hermosillo players
Portland Beavers players
San Antonio Missions players
San Diego Padres players
South Georgia Waves players
Tucson Padres players
Vero Beach Dodgers players
Yaquis de Obregón players